The Auckland East by-election was a by-election in the New Zealand electorate of Auckland East, an urban seat at the top of the North Island.

The by-election was held on 16 June 1910, and was precipitated by the death of sitting Liberal member of parliament Frederick Baume.

Background
The election was won by Baume's cousin and former Mayor of Auckland, Arthur Myers who stood as an independent Liberal.

William Richardson, former secretary to opposition leader William Massey ran as a prohibitionist candidate. He opposed moves the Ward administration was making claiming it was working "hand in glove" with the liquor industry. Richardson had stood for the Auckland East seat in both the 1905 and 1908 elections placing third and second respectively.

Another opposition candidate was Reginald Walter Hill, who ran as an independent supporter of the Reform Party who only registered candidacy at the last minute.

Two Labour Party candidates ran against each other, with George Davis coming in second place. George Irving McKnight was originally chosen by the Labour Party, but proved unsatisfactory. His endorsement was revoked and the party chose to sponsor Davis instead. The prohibition league also endorsed Davis as Myers owned a brewery.

Result
The following table gives the election results:

Notes

References

Auckland East 1910
1910 elections in New Zealand
History of Auckland
1910s in Auckland
Politics of the Auckland Region